Silent Valley may refer to:

 Silent Valley National Park, in Palakkad district, Kerala, India
 Silent Valley Reservoir, a reservoir located in the Mourne Mountains near Kilkeel, County Down in Northern Ireland
 Silent Valley (2012 film)
 Silent Valley (1935 film)